The Falcon of the Desert (Italian:La magnifica sfida/ The Magnificent Challenge)  is a 1965 Italian adventure film directed by Miguel Lluch.

Cast
Kirk Morris as Kadir
Aldo Sambrell
Dina Loy
Tomás Picó
Erika Jones
Juan Cortés

External links
 

1965 films
1965 adventure films
Italian adventure films
1960s Italian-language films
Films directed by Miguel Lluch
Films set in deserts
Films shot in Almería
1960s Italian films